Things Falling Apart is the second remix album by American industrial rock band Nine Inch Nails, released by Nothing Records and Interscope Records on November 21, 2000. It is the companion remix disc to the band's third studio album, The Fragile. The U.S. promotional CD single for "Into the Void" is also labeled as "Halo 16". "10 Miles High" is the only song that was a B-side to a Nine Inch Nails single to be included on the album, though the version on this release differs from the album/B-side version. It was only released on the vinyl version of The Fragile, while appearing as a B-side to the band's 1999 single "We're in This Together".

Unlike The Fragile, which received mostly positive reviews, Things Falling Apart was critically panned by reviewers and even received a sarcastic rating of 10/10 from NME.

Track listing
All songs written by Trent Reznor, except where noted.

CD

Notes
 The digital release is identical to the CD version, except each track is cut off by one second, affecting the seamless flow between several tracks.

12" vinyl

Charts

References

External links
 
 Archive of thingsfallingapart.com

2000 remix albums
Albums produced by Adrian Sherwood
Albums produced by Danny Lohner
Albums produced by Trent Reznor
Interscope Records remix albums
Nine Inch Nails remix albums
Nothing Records remix albums
Nothing Records EPs